Robinsonia lefaivrei is a moth in the family Erebidae. It was described by William Schaus in 1895. It is found in Brazil.

References

Moths described in 1895
Robinsonia (moth)